Giuseppe Soda (born 2 April 1967, in Gorgonzola), is the dean of SDA Bocconi School of Management.

Career 

Giuseppe “Beppe” Soda Ph.D. is Professor of Organization Theory and Design, and Network Analysis at Bocconi University, Milan. The Board of Trustees of Bocconi University has appointed Professor Soda as Dean of SDA Bocconi School of Management in 2016 and made the decision to renew his leadership in 2020. Prior to the appointment as Dean, Prof. Soda was elected in 2013 as the Director of the Management & Technology Department at Bocconi University, and appointed as the Head of Research Division at SDA Bocconi School of Management for the period 2006-2013.

Dean Soda has a strong academic background; his influential research has investigated the performance consequences of the dynamic interplay between organizational architectures and organizational networks. His contribution on the origins and evolution of organizational networks is considered very seminal.  His works has been published in the most relevant academic journals such as Administrative Science Quarterly, Strategic Management Journal, Organization Science, Academy of Management Journal, Strategic Organization, Academy of Management Annals, Journal of Management, Organization Studies and many others. 

As Dean, Prof. Soda serves the community of management schools as member of EFMD (European Foundation for Management Development) - EQUIS Accreditation Board and elected member of the GMAC (Graduate Management Admission Council) Board of Directors. Prof. Soda has also a relevant industry expertise as advisors and independent member of Board of Directors for listed and not-listed firms.

References 

1967 births
Living people
Bocconi University alumni
Academic staff of Bocconi University